Thomas Newbold (August 2, 1760 – December 18, 1823) was a U.S. Democratic-Republican politician.

He was born in Springfield Township, Burlington County, New Jersey.  He engaged in agricultural pursuits.  He was a member of the New Jersey General Assembly in 1797.  He then became involved in banking.  He was elected as a Democratic-Republican to the United States House of Representatives from New Jersey and served from March 4, 1807 to March 3, 1813, but was not re-elected to the United States House of Representatives in 1812.  He again was a member of the New Jersey General Assembly from 1820 to 1822.  He died in Springfield Township, Burlington County, New Jersey.  He was interred in the Old Upper Springfield Friends Burying Ground.

References

Sources

Thomas Newbold at The Political Graveyard

1760 births
1823 deaths
Members of the New Jersey General Assembly
People from Springfield Township, Burlington County, New Jersey
Politicians from Burlington County, New Jersey
Democratic-Republican Party members of the United States House of Representatives from New Jersey